is a Japanese politician of the Liberal Democratic Party, a member of the House of Representatives in the Diet (national legislature) and formerly Minister of Transport. A native of Setaka, Fukuoka and graduate of Nihon University, he was elected for the first time in 1980 after an unsuccessful run in 1979.

The character Tetsuya Gamon in the manga Akumetsu is based on him.

References

External links 
  

1940 births
Living people
Politicians from Fukuoka Prefecture
Nihon University alumni
Members of the House of Representatives (Japan)
Government ministers of Japan
Liberal Democratic Party (Japan) politicians
21st-century Japanese politicians